Karimabad-e Olya (also Romanized as Karīmābād-e ‘Olyā; also known as Karīmābād-e Bālā) is a village in Hoseynabad Rural District, Esmaili District, Anbarabad County, Kerman Province, Iran. At the 2006 census, its population was 699, in 154 families.

References 

Populated places in Anbarabad County